Mamluk is a social institution in the Islamic world before the nineteenth century.

Mamluk, Mameluke, or Mamaluke may refer to:

Mamluk states and culture
 Mamluk Sultanate, a state that ruled Egypt and Syria from the 13th through the early 16th centuries
 Mamluk dynasty (Delhi), a state in northern India in the 13th century
 Mamluk dynasty (Iraq) in the 18th and 19th centuries
 Mamluk-Kipchak language
 Mamluk architecture
 Mamluk carpets
 Mamluk playing cards

Other
 Mameluke (American horse) (foaled 1948), an American racehorse
 Mameluke (British horse) (1824–1849), a British racehorse
 Mameluke sword, used by the United States Marine Corps and formerly by the British Army
 Mamelukes of the Imperial Guard, a cavalry unit of Napoleon's Imperial Guard
 Mamluk Ali Nanautawi (1789–1851), Indian Muslim scholar
 The Mamalukes, a professional wrestling tag team
 Tony Mamaluke (born 1977), the ring name of American professional wrestler Charles Spencer

See also